Everett Freeman (February 2, 1911 – January 24, 1991) was an American screenwriter and producer. He died of kidney failure on January 24, 1991, in Westwood, Los Angeles, California at age 79.

From 1935 to 1970, Freeman's screenplay credits are:
 1,000 Dollars a Minute
 Married Before Breakfast
 The Chaser
 You Can't Cheat an Honest Man
 Larceny, Inc.
 George Washington Slept Here
 Thank Your Lucky Stars
 The Princess and the Pirate
 It Happened on Fifth Avenue
 The Secret Life of Walter Mitty
 Lulu Belle
 Miss Grant Takes Richmond
 The Lady Takes a Sailor
 Pretty Baby
 Jim Thorpe – All-American
 Too Young to Kiss
 Million Dollar Mermaid
 Destination Gobi
 Kelly and Me
 My Man Godfrey
 Marjorie Morningstar
 The Glass Bottom Boat
 Where Were You When the Lights Went Out?
 The Maltese Bippy
 How Do I Love Thee?

References

External links
 

1911 births
1991 deaths
20th-century American male writers
20th-century American screenwriters
American film producers
American male screenwriters
Jewish American screenwriters
20th-century American Jews